The Second Avenue station is a station on the IND Sixth Avenue Line of the New York City Subway, located at the intersection of Second Avenue and Houston Street on the border between the East Village and the Lower East Side, in Manhattan. It is served by the F train at all times and the <F> train during rush hours in the peak direction.

History

The station opened on January 1, 1936, as part of the portion of the Sixth Avenue Line between West Fourth Street–Washington Square and East Broadway. Upon opening, E trains, which ran from Jackson Heights, Queens to Hudson Terminal, were shifted to the new line to East Broadway. Two express tracks were built from West Fourth Street, under Houston Street, until Essex Street-Avenue A, with the express tracks effectively terminating at the Second Avenue station since there were no stops east of there. The tracks were intended to travel under the East River and connect with the never-built IND Worth Street Line in Williamsburg, Brooklyn.

From December 2001 to June 2010, this station was known on transit maps and announced on digital announcements as Lower East Side–Second Avenue station, when it served as the southern terminal for V trains, which arrived and departed on either center track. After the V's elimination, the center tracks have not been not used in revenue service, although a limited number of rush-hour M trains from Queens terminated here between July 2017 and April 2018 during a reconstruction project on the BMT Myrtle Avenue Line (replicating the former V service).

Station layout

Second Avenue has two island platforms and four tracks. F trains run on the outer tracks, while the inner tracks are not used in regular service. When the station opened, all four Sixth Avenue tracks ran continuously from West Fourth Street through Second Avenue. During the construction of the Chrystie Street Connection in the 1950s and 1960s, the center express tracks at Broadway–Lafayette Street were severed from the tracks at Second Avenue and rerouted to the Chrystie Street subway, running through Grand Street station to the north side of the Manhattan Bridge.

West (railroad north) of the station, the inner tracks are connected by a diamond crossover before merging with the outer local tracks; this allows the station to be used as a terminal for southbound trains. East (railroad south) of the station, the express tracks end at bumper blocks, while the local tracks continue along Houston Street before curving south into Essex Street and continuing through Delancey Street station.

The trackside walls have a medium Parma violet trim line with a slightly darker border, and small tile captions reading "2ND AVE" in white on black run below it at regular intervals. The platform columns are concrete and painted indigo, and there are especially large columns with built-in benches at the centers of the platforms. Despite the station's name, the exit and mezzanine at Second Avenue is only open part-time. The full-time booth is located at the First Avenue mezzanine. The station previously had a full-length mezzanine. However, most of the mezzanine was closed, and the closed areas currently hold offices while the rest are used for storage space.

Exits
All entrances/exits are single-wide street stairs serving both platforms via the two mezzanine areas. The western mezzanine has two exits leading to:
 NW corner of Houston Street and Second Avenue
 SW corner of Houston Street and Chrystie Street

The eastern mezzanine has two exits leading to:
 NW corner of Houston Street and First Avenue
 SW corner of Houston Street and Allen Street

The closed mezzanine area had an exit to the median of Houston Street near Forsyth Street.

Provisions for other lines

First Avenue Subway mezzanine
There is another, unfinished mezzanine on the east side of First Avenue. This second mezzanine is accessible only through now-blocked passages past the east end of the platforms. This mezzanine was built to address a subway down First Avenue, if one were to be built.

Express tracks
East of the station, the center tracks continue disused along Houston, but rise to an upper level and stub-end near Avenue A at bumper blocks. Near the end, these tail tracks begin to separate to create a provision for a center track which only extends about 10 or 15 feet and stops at the bulkhead at the end of the tunnel. It was planned that these tracks would continue under the East River to the South Fourth Street Line, part of a never-built system expansion. These tracks east of the station were previously used for train storage but became an oft-frequented spot for the homeless due to its location near local missions and soup kitchens. The area was cleared out in 1990, and corrugated metal walls with bumper blocks were installed just past the east end of the platforms to seal the tunnels.

Second Avenue Subway service
As part of the 1929 IND Second System, plans for the Second Avenue Subway called for the new line to run directly above the existing Second Avenue station. Room was left for the anticipated four-track right-of-way above the Sixth Avenue trackways and directly east of the entrance  at Second Avenue; on the west end of the platforms, the ceiling drops. Above this lower ceiling is an empty space that can fit either four trackways, two side platforms, and one island platform (similar to 34th Street–Penn Station on the IND Eighth Avenue Line) or two trackways and two side platforms. The trackways can be made out from the ceiling pattern from the active platforms. The mezzanine at Second Avenue, possibly intended as temporary, has doors that lead to the unused track space. Crew rooms were built on most of the space prior to the introduction of the V.

The current plans for the Second Avenue Subway, made in the 2000s, will not use this space; the new Houston Street station will instead be built below the existing one, with a free transfer between them. The decision to use a deeper alignment under Chrystie Street was made to simplify construction and lessen impact to the community. Second Avenue service will be tentatively provided by the T train once Phase 3 of construction is complete. When this happens, the station will become a terminal station for southbound service. There will be a double crossover north of the station. However, Phase 4 of construction will extend the line south, below Houston Street, in the direction of Hanover Square.

In addition to the current entrances, the Second Avenue Subway station will utilize a new entrance to be constructed at Second Avenue and Third Street. In accordance with the Americans with Disabilities Act of 1990, the Second Avenue Subway platform will be wheelchair-accessible; however, it is unknown if the Sixth Avenue Line platforms will also become accessible.

Notes

References

External links

 
 Station Reporter — F Train
 Abandoned Stations — IND Second System unfinished stations
 Second Avenue entrance from Google Maps Street View
 First Avenue entrance from Google Maps Street View
 Mezzanine from Google Maps Street View
 Platforms from Google Maps Street View

IND Sixth Avenue Line stations
New York City Subway stations in Manhattan
Railway stations in the United States opened in 1936
1936 establishments in New York City
Proposed IND Second Avenue Line stations
Lower East Side
East Village, Manhattan
Second Avenue (Manhattan)